The 2015 Conference USA men's soccer tournament was the 21st edition of the tournament. It determined the Conference USA's automatic berth into the 2015 NCAA Division I Men's Soccer Championship.

The FIU Golden Panthers won the tournament, besting the Marshall Thundering Herd in the championship match.

Qualification 

The top seven teams in Conference USA based on their conference record qualified for the tournament. Top-seeded Kentucky earned a bye to the semifinal round.

Bracket

Schedule

Quarterfinals

Semifinals

Final

Statistical leaders

Top goalscorers

All-Tournament team 

 Daniel Gonzalez, FIU - Offensive MVP
 Arthur Clapot, FIU - Defensive MVP
 Marvin Hezel, FIU
 Patrick Lopez, FIU
 Dominik Reining, Marshall
 Arthur Duchesne, Marshall
 Rimario Gordon, Marshall
 Charlie Reymann, Kentucky
 Kristoffer Tollefsen, Kentucky
 Tor Nyboe, South Carolina
 Kurtis Turner, South Carolina

See also 
 Conference USA
 2015 Conference USA men's soccer season
 2015 NCAA Division I men's soccer season
 2015 NCAA Division I Men's Soccer Championship

References 

tournament 2015
Conference USA Men's Soccer Tournament
Conference USA Men's Soccer Tournament
Conference USA Men's Soccer Tournament